Slidre is the administrative centre of Vestre Slidre Municipality in Innlandet county, Norway. The village is located along the Slidrefjorden in the Valdres district.

History
Slidre is the site of the Slidredomen, a medieval era stone church.

The village was the administrative centre of the old Slidre Municipality from 1838 until 1849 when the municipality was divided.

Name
The municipality (and the parish) were named after the old Slidre farm ( or ) since this was the location of the first Slidre Church that was built during the 12th century. The meaning of the name is not definitively known. It could be derived from the word slir which means the narrow depression through which a river runs.

References

Vestre Slidre
Villages in Innlandet